St. Feighin's is a civil parish in County Westmeath, Ireland.

St. Feighin's is one of 8 civil parishes in the barony of Fore in the Province of Leinster.

St. Feighin's civil parish comprises 20 townlands: Ballany, Barbavilla Demesne, Ben, Benisonlodge or Bratty, Bratty or Benisonlodge, Carpenterstown, Clonnageeragh, Collinstown, Corbally, Deerpark, Fore, Gillardstown, Hammondstown and Tonaghmore, Hilltown, Lakill and Moortown, Loughanavagh or Newpark, Loughpark, Moortown and Lakill, Newpark or Loughanavagh, Ranaghan, Templanstown, Tonaghmore and Hammondstown, Tonashammer and Windtown

The neighbouring civil parishes are: Killeagh and Moylagh (both County Meath) and Foyran to the north, Kilcumny and St. Mary's to the east, Killulagh and Kilpatrick to the south, Faughalstown to the south and west and Rathgarve to the west.

References

External links
St. Feighin's civil parish at the IreAtlas Townland Data Base
St. Feighin's civil parish at townlands.ie
St. Feighin's civil parish at The Placename Database of Ireland

Civil parishes of County Westmeath